The Rosario Department (in Spanish, Departamento Rosario) is an administrative subdivision (departamento) of the . It is located on the south of the province, with its eastern border coinciding with the provincial border along the Paraná River. This department is the most populated in the province (comprising more than one third of the total population).

The department's head town is the city of Rosario; most of the population is concentrated in its metropolitan area (Greater Rosario), which reaches north into the neighboring San Lorenzo Department. Other important cities and towns are Ibarlucea, Granadero Baigorria, Funes, Pérez, Piñero, Zavalla, Pueblo Nuevo, Villa Diego, Álvarez, Villa Amelia, Acebal, Uranga, Arroyo Seco, Fighiera, and Coronel Bogado.

Limiting the Rosario Department to the south is the Constitución Department (whose head town is Villa Constitución) and to the east and north, the San Lorenzo Department (head town San Lorenzo). On the eastern border, along the Paraná River, is the heart of the Industrial Corridor, a productive area with a concentration of light industries (such as soybean oil and pod processing) and major ports.

References
In Spanish.
 Government of the Province of Santa Fe
  Inforama] - Municipalities of the Rosario Department.
 

 
Departments of Santa Fe Province